Andrew Pagett (born 25 April 1982) is a Welsh professional snooker player.

Career

Early career 
He played on Challenge Tour from 2003 to 2005, and first qualified for the Main Tour in 2008–09, but lost his place after just one season. He regained his place for the 2010–11 season by topping the Welsh rankings. He is a practice partner of Mark Williams.

2010/2011 season 
Pagett qualified for the 2011 World Snooker Championship after winning four qualifying matches. He knocked out Zhang Anda, Bjorn Haneveer and Nigel Bond, before beating Andrew Higginson 10–6 to qualify for the final stages of a major event for the first time, where he was defeated 10–7 by Jamie Cope.

2011/2012 season 
Pagett began the 2011–12 season ranked 71st in the world meaning he would have to win four qualifying matches to reach the ranking event main draws. However, after attempting to qualify for all eight tournaments he only won two matches; one at the Australian Goldfields Open and the other at the German Masters. Pagett played in 11 of the 12 minor-ranking Players Tour Championship events throughout the season, with his best finishes coming in Event 4 and Event 9, where he reached the last 32. He was ranked number 82 on the PTC Order of Merit. Pagett finished the season without a world ranking and will not play on the main tour in the 2012–13 season.

2012/2013 season 
Pagett could only enter Players Tour Championship events in the 2012/2013 season, taking part in seven of them. His best finish came in the third European Tour event in Belgium, where he beat Raf van de Maele, Robbie Williams, Stuart Bingham, Thepchaiya Un-Nooh and former world champion Neil Robertson, before losing to Mark Allen 1–4 in the semi-finals. It was this result which largely contributed to him finishing 55th on the Order of Merit to claim one of the eight spots on offer to players not on the main tour for the 2013–14 and 2014–15 seasons.

2013/2014 season 
Pagett made a dream start to the season as in his first match he defeated world number one Mark Selby 5–3 to qualify for the 2013 Wuxi Classic in China where he lost 2–5 to David Gilbert in the first round. Later in the year he reached the last 32 of a ranking event for only the second time in his career at his home tournament the Welsh Open. Pagett beat Marcus Campbell 4–0 and Gerard Greene 4–3, before losing 0–4 to Stephen Maguire. Pagett ended his first season back on the tour ranked world number 103.

2014/2015 season 
After losing in the qualifying rounds of the first three events of the 2014–15 season, Pagett beat Rory McLeod 6–3 to play in the International Championship, where he lost 1–6 to Peter Ebdon. He was knocked out of the first round of both the UK Championship and Welsh Open 6–2 by Mike Dunn and 4–2 by McLeod respectively. Pagett's only win at the venue of a ranking this year was a 4–2 success over Zack Richardson at the Indian Open, before he lost 1–4 to Chris Wakelin in the second round. He was relegated from the tour at the end of the season as the number 80 in the world rankings and did not enter Q School.

2020/2021 season
Pagett regained his place on the professional circuit following his victory at the 2020 EBSA European Snooker Championship. However, he had to have surgery to correct a perforated bowel which required 4–6 months rest and rehabilitation. His place was therefore deferred to the 2021-22 World Snooker Tour.

Performance and rankings timeline

Career finals

Amateur finals: 9 (4 titles)

References

External links 

 Andrew Pagett at worldsnooker.com
 Profile on Global Snooker

Sportspeople from Newport, Wales
Living people
Welsh snooker players
1982 births